The Intermountain West, or Intermountain Region, is a geographic and geological region of the Western United States. It is located between the front ranges of the Rocky Mountains on the east and the Cascade Range and Sierra Nevada on the west.

Topography
The Intermountain West has a basin and range and plateau topography.  Some of the region's rivers reach the Pacific Ocean, such as the Columbia River and Colorado River. Other regional rivers and streams are in endorheic basins and cannot reach the sea, such as the Walker River and Owens River. These flow into brackish or seasonally dry lakes or desert sinks.
Portions of this region include:
 Basin and Range Province
 Colorado Plateau
 Great Basin
 Intermontane Plateaus

Climate
The climate of the Intermountain Region is affected by location and elevation. The sub-regions are in rain shadows from the Cascade or Sierra Nevada ranges that block precipitation from Pacific storms. The winter weather depends on latitude. In the southern portion, winters are shorter, warmer and have less winter precipitation and snow. In the northern portion, winters are cold and moist. All areas have hot summers. North American Monsoon storms can occur in the region during the mid-summer, coming northeast from the Pacific Ocean and Mexican Plateau.

Natural history
The flora at lower elevations includes deserts and xeric shrublands and temperate grasslands and shrublands biome vegetation. Higher elevation montane habitats include temperate coniferous forests biome vegetation, including groves and forests of various species of pine, cedar, juniper, aspen, and other trees, and understory shrubs, and perennials.
Intermountain West ecoregions include:
 Central Basin and Range ecoregion – North American Deserts; Level III ecoregion (EPA)
 Columbia Plateau (ecoregion) – Temperate grasslands, savannas, and shrublands biome (WWF)
 Eastern Cascades Slopes and Foothills (ecoregion) – Northwestern Forested Mountains; Level III ecoregion (EPA)
 Great Basin shrub steppe – Deserts and xeric shrublands biome (WWF)
 Great Basin montane forests – Temperate coniferous forest biome  (WWF)
 Northern Basin and Range ecoregion – North American Deserts; Level III ecoregion (EPA)
 Palouse grasslands ecoregion – Temperate grasslands, savannas, and shrublands biome (WWF)
 Snake River Plain (ecoregion) – North American Deserts; Level III ecoregion (EPA)
 Wasatch and Uinta montane forests ecoregion – Temperate coniferous forest biome (WWF)

Some sections are agriculturally cultivated with water diversions for irrigation systems. Cattle ranching is practiced in the region as well. Cultivated crops include corn, potatoes, sugar beets, grass hay, and alfalfa, the latter two crops are used for livestock feed.

Demographics and sociology
For thousands of years the Intermountain West has been the homeland for many Native American cultures, tribes, and bands. The 18th-century fur trade (northern areas), and 19th-century westward expansion of the United States brought irreversible cultural changes. The completion of the First transcontinental railroad through the region accelerated non-native settlements and development.

Historically, the Intermountain West area centered in Utah is associated with Latter-day Saint (Mormon) settlements, and the region has the highest percentage of LDS members in the United States currently. That region is also known as the Mormon Corridor.

Because of its low population density and diverse economy, the survivalist writers James Wesley Rawles and Joel Skousen both recommend the region as a preferred locale for "strategic relocation" and for building survival retreats, thus referring to it as the American Redoubt.

Intermountain states 
The intermountain states are generally considered to be Nevada, Utah, Idaho, the western third of Montana, Arizona north of the Mogollon Rim, Colorado from the Front Range westward, New Mexico from the central mountain chain westward, and Far West Texas from the Pecos River westward. The intermountain states are so named from having all or portions between the Rockies, Sierras, and Cascades. The intermountain states are included among states classified as the Mountain States.

See also

 Western United States
 Index: Regions of the Western United States

References

Regions of the Western United States
Regions of the United States
Western Canada
Geology of Western Canada
Geography of Western Canada
Regions of Canada